Synovial may refer to:

 Synovial fluid
 Synovial joint
 Synovial membrane
 Synovial bursa